Kolah Jub-e Esfandiari (also Romanized as Kolah Jūb-e Esfandīārī) is a village in Howmeh Rural District, in the Central District of Gilan-e Gharb County, Kermanshah Province, Iran. At the 2006 census, its population was 163, in 28 families.

References 

Populated places in Gilan-e Gharb County